Gizem Çam (born 4 April 1991) is a Turkish female swimmer competing in butterfly and backstroke events.

A member of Fenerbahçe Swimming in Istanbul, she is holder of many national records in different age categories. She set a national record in the 50m backstroke event with 27.82 at the FINA World Short Course Swimming Championships held in Istanbul, Turkey.

Achievements

See also 
 Turkish women in sports

References

1991 births
Place of birth missing (living people)
Turkish female swimmers
Female butterfly swimmers
Female backstroke swimmers
Fenerbahçe swimmers
Living people
Swimmers at the 2013 Mediterranean Games
Mediterranean Games competitors for Turkey
20th-century Turkish sportswomen
21st-century Turkish sportswomen